HBO Max is an over-the-top subscription service owned and operated by Warner Bros. Discovery. It distributes a number of original shows, including original series, specials, miniseries, and documentaries and films. The titles in this article have been acquired by HBO Max from other countries for exclusive first-run release in the United States.

TV series

Drama

Comedy

Animation

Kids & family

Unscripted

Docuseries

Reality

Films

Feature films

Documentaries

Specials

Upcoming

TV series

Drama

Comedy

Animation

Unscripted

Films

Feature films

Documentaries

Notes

References

Internet-related lists
HBO Max
 
Warner Bros. Discovery-related lists